Jazzwise is a monthly British jazz magazine, launched in 1997. Jazzwise has a broad sub-genre coverage, from jazz, improv, hard bop, and jazz-rock to bebop and classic jazz, and also covers jazz crossover, including jazz-funk, jazz hip-hop, and jazz-electronica. It features news coverage, a national gig guide, gossip column, a jazz-on-film page, opinion column, in-depth features and a review section covering new CD releases, reissues, vinyl, DVDs, books and live reviews. Breaking news stories also feature on the Jazzwise magazine website. Jazzwise also mentors new jazz writers through its ongoing intern scheme and the Write Stuff workshops held each November during the London Jazz Festival.

The Jazzwise app features the full edition of the magazine and was the first jazz magazine app in the iTunes Newsstand.

100 Best Jazz Albums of All Time
The September 2009 issue of Jazzwise was titled "The 100 Jazz Albums That Shook the World", conceived by Jon Newey and Keith Shadwick, with contributions by Stuart Nicholson, Brian Priestley, Duncan Heining, Kevin Le Gendre, Charles Alexander, and Tom Barlow.

Awards
In 2006 Jazzwise editor Jon Newey won journalist of the year at the Parliamentary Jazz Awards. In 2007 Jazzwise won two awards, best Jazz publication at the Parliamentary Jazz Awards  and best Jazz publication at the Ronnie Scott's awards. In 2009 Jazzwise writer Kevin Le Gendre won journalist of the year at the Parliamentary Jazz Awards, while in 2010 Jazzwise won best jazz publication at the Parliamentary Jazz Awards for the second time and gig guide editor Mike Flynn won journalist of the year, while CD reissues reviewer Alyn Shipton won broadcaster of the year. In 2012, editor Jon Newey won the Parliamentary Jazz Award for journalist of the year for a second time, and in 2013 Jazzwise won the coveted Best Jazz Media accolade at the prestigious Jazz FM awards in January 2013.

Jazzwise was initially part of Jazzwise Publications Limited. The Jazzwise brand and magazine were acquired in February 2013 by MA Business & Leisure, a division of Mark Allen Group. The Jazzwise Education and Jazzwise Direct brand were retained by the original owner and renamed SendMeMusic.

References

Sources

External links
Jazzwise Magazine website

Music magazines published in the United Kingdom
Jazz magazines
Magazines established in 1997
Monthly magazines published in the United Kingdom
Magazines published in London